Açucena is a city in the Brazilian state of Minas Gerais. In 2020 its population was estimated to be 9,368.

References

Municipalities in Minas Gerais